James Demouchette (May 20, 1955 – September 22, 1992) was an American inmate in Texas, who was sentenced to death for the 1976 double-murder of two Pizza Hut clerks during a robbery in Houston. While imprisoned, he gained infamy as the "Meanest Man on Death Row" for his deviant behavior while housed on death row; he fatally stabbed another inmate with a homemade knife, and on another occasion he attacked three corrections officers with a knife. There were also reports of him setting fires around the prison. By the time of his execution in 1992, his case had attracted particular media attention due to his behavior. His case has also been used as an example by advocates of capital punishment.

Early life 
James Demouchette was born on May 20, 1955, in Bexar County, Texas. As a child, he was known to set fires and kill stray dogs and cats. He failed elementary school multiple times due to his deviant behavior, for such he served time at a state school for juvenile delinquencies. He also served time for negligent homicide as a juvenile and for larceny and burglary as an adult.

Criminal offenses

1977 murder convictions 
On October 17, 1976, James Demouchette and his younger brother, 18-year-old Christopher Demouchette, entered a Pizza Hut restaurant in Houston, where Geoff Hambrick was working as the restaurant manager, along with 19-year-old Scott Sorrell working as assistant manager, and Scott's roommate 22-year-old Robert “Chuck” White. Hambrick told the two to leave because it was close to closing time. However, instead of leaving, James pulled out a 380. Caliber revolver and started shooting. During the shooting, both Sorrell and White were shot dead, while Hambrick was shot in the head, but was alive and pretended to play dead. Both brothers then ransacked the back office and left the restaurant with stolen change.

The Demouchette brothers were arrested not long after, and Hambrick identified and testified against the brothers. James was convicted of capital murder and sentenced to death in 1977, while Christopher was spared execution and instead given a life sentence. He died on August 20, 2018, at the age of 60.

Death row 
In 1981, James' sentence was overturned by the Texas Court of Criminal Appeals, arguing that Demouchette had not been told his right to remain silent prior to his clemency exam. In the new trial, he was again sentenced to death in April 1983. In August 1983, Demouchette fatally stabbed fellow inmate Johnny E. Swift a total of 16 times with a homemade knife while inside a prison dayroom. For this, Demouchette was given an additional life sentence, with his death sentences upheld. Months later, he beat and stabbed two other inmates, both of whom survived.

Demouchette also started setting fires in his cell, destroying TVs and at one point raped a cellmate. Following this, media attention surrounding the case began to increase, and Demouchette was nicknamed "The Meanest Man on Death Row". On January 6, 1988, Demouchette attacked corrections officers Charles Agee, 26, Scott Stoughton, 24, and Roger Barkin, 22, with a homemade knife after they attempted to search his cell for weapons. None of the officers were seriously injured, but Agee sustained three puncture wounds to the right thigh.

Execution 
With his execution fast approaching, Demouchette's lawyers attempted to get the Supreme Court to review the case, but they ultimately did not decide to step in. On September 22, 1992, Demouchette was executed by lethal injection, becoming the 10th inmate executed in Texas in 1992. He offered no last words. In total, he spent 15 years on death row.

He is buried at Captain Joe Byrd Cemetery.

See also 
 Capital punishment in Texas
 Capital punishment in the United States
 List of people executed by lethal injection
 List of people executed in Texas, 1990–1999

References

Bibliography

External links 
 JAMES DEMOUCHETTE v. STATE TEXAS

1955 births
1992 deaths
1976 murders in the United States
1983 murders in the United States
20th-century African-American people
20th-century American criminals
20th-century executions by Texas
20th-century executions of American people
American male criminals
American people convicted of burglary
American prisoners sentenced to life imprisonment
American rapists
Criminals from Texas
Executed American serial killers
Male serial killers
People executed by Texas by lethal injection
Violence against men in North America